The 2020 British National Track Championships are a series of track cycling competitions. The National Track Championships (excluding certain events) were held from 24 to 26 January 2020 at the Manchester Velodrome. They are organised and sanctioned by British Cycling, and are open to British cyclists. The championships are sponsored by HSBC. 

The Derny, Omnium, Madison and Tandem events will take place at various venues throughout the year.

Medal summary

Men's Events

Women's Events

References

National Track Championships
British National Track Championships